Hypochilus gertschi, or Gertsch's lampshade-web spider, is a species of lampshade weaver in the family Hypochilidae. It is found in the United States.

References

Hypochilidae
Articles created by Qbugbot
Spiders described in 1963